Crabeater Point is a headland at the southeast extremity of Mobiloil Inlet,  east of Victory Nunatak, on the east coast of the Antarctic Peninsula. The point, the northwest extremity of a prominent ridge, was photographed from aircraft of the United States Antarctic Service on September 28, 1940, and by the Ronne Antarctic Research Expedition (trimetrogon air photos), December 22, 1947. It was surveyed in December 1958 by the Falkland Islands Dependencies Survey who gave the descriptive name. The ridge of which this point is the extremity resembles a recumbent crabeater seal when seen from the air.

References 

Headlands of Graham Land
Bowman Coast